The Osorno–Llanquihue Basin is a sedimentary basin located in south-central Chile in the forearc region of the Andes. From north to south the basin spans and area from Catamutún to Reloncaví Sound (40–42° S). The deepest part of the basin lie to the east. The lower levels of the basin are occupied by coal-bearing Cheuquemó Formation among other units while the Miocene-aged marine Santo Domingo Formation makes up much of the upper stratigraphy. The uppermost levels are made of sediments of Quaternary age of glacial, glaci-fluvial, glaci-lacustrine and volcanic character. The thickness of Quaternary sediments is greater to the south reaching almost  in Puerto Montt. Sediments in the western part of the basin are roughly estimated to have reached  during burial and diagenesis.

References

Bibliography

Forearc basins
Geology of Los Lagos Region
Geology of Los Ríos Region
Sedimentary basins of Chile